Neo Souli is a village and a community in the municipality of Patras, Achaea, Greece. Neo Souli had a population of 756 in 2011 for the village proper, and 847 for the community Souli, which consists of the villages Neo Souli, Agios Ioannis, Kefalovryso, Mintzaiika, Panagia and Profitis Ilias. Souli was part of the municipality of Patras between 1841 and 1912, and again after 1997. Between 1912 and 1997, it was an independent community.

Geography
Neo Souli is located in the plains, 5 km southeast of the city centre of Patras, just outside the beltway. The Panachaiko mountains lie to the east. It is located between two rivers, the Glafkos and the Diakoniaris, both flowing from the Panachaiko.

Folk dance festival
Neo Souli is known for its folk dance festival (Φεστιβάλ Λαϊκού Χορού), which has been held annually since 1993 in the last weekend of July. Dance groups from all over Greece perform at the festival.

Population

See also
List of settlements in Achaea

External links
Neo Souli GTP Travel Pages

References

Patras
Populated places in Achaea